Sathwik Reddy (born 12 January 2002) is an Indian cricketer. He made his List A debut on 28 February 2021, for Hyderabad in the 2020–21 Vijay Hazare Trophy.

References

External links
 

2002 births
Living people
Indian cricketers
Hyderabad cricketers
Place of birth missing (living people)